Mi fortuna es amarte (English title: Your Love Is My Fortune) is a Mexican telenovela that aired on Las Estrellas from 8 November 2021 to 13 March 2022. The series is produced by Nicandro Díaz González. It is an adaptation of the Colombian telenovela La quiero a morir created by Luis Felipe Salamanca. It stars Susana González and David Zepeda. The telenovela follows Natalia and Vicente, who are forced by life circumstances to live together under the same roof.

The telenovela is streaming on Vix since 21 July 2022 and has a total of 95 episodes.

Plot 
Natalia Robles (Susana González) has dedicated her life to her family. On the eve of celebrating her 20th wedding anniversary, she discovers the betrayal of her husband, Adrián Cantú (Sergio Sendel), who is on the run with Verónica Alanís (Denia Agalianou), Natalia's best friend. Adrián and Verónica have hatched a plan to flee after having scammed the clients of the real estate agency where they are both partners, along with Mario (Carlos de la Mota), Verónica's boyfriend. Adrián leaves Natalia bankrupt. However, in the midst of her situation, she decides to move forward in order to raise her daughters Andrea (Fernanda Urdapilleta) and Regina (Daniela Martínez Caballero).

On the other hand, Vicente Ramírez (David Zepeda), suffers the loss of his wife Lucía Nieto (Adriana Fonseca), who is killed in a robbery. Vicente's young son Benjamín (André Sebastián González) witnessed the death of his mother and suffers trauma that leaves him speechless. The day after burying Lucía, Vicente is confronted with the surprise that he has been a victim of fraud by Adrián's real estate agency. Natalia and Vicente's lives come together when he arrives at the real estate agency to claim the money that was scammed from them, along with the other creditors. Natalia, on behalf of her husband, and Mario, ask for time to be able to repair the economic damage. Natalia and Vicente will discover that even in the midst of the worst experience, love can always be rescued.

Cast

Main 
 Susana González as Natalia Robles García
 David Zepeda as Vicente "Chente" Ramírez Pérez
 Sergio Sendel as Adrián Cantú Garza
 Chantal Andere as Constanza Robles García
 Omar Fierro as Elías Haddad Nassar
 Luis Felipe Tovar as Gustavo "Tavo" Martínez Sánchez
 Carlos de la Mota as Mario Rivas Acosta
 Michelle González as Olga Pascual Chávez
 Ana Bertha Espin as Teresa García Jiménez
 Lisset as Samia Karam Mansour
 Luz Elena González as Soledad "Chole" Pascual Gama
 Michelle Vieth as Fernanda Diez Acuña
 Dayren Chávez as Valentina Cruz López
 Ricardo Silva as Claudio Sevilla León
 Eduardo Liñán as Carlos Zuno
 Ximena Cordoba as Tania Rivas Acosta
 Denia Agalianou as Verónica Alanís Gómez
 Marcos Montero as William
 Ricardo Franco as Félix
 Said P as Sinba
 Carlos Mosmo as Donovan
 Fernanda Urdapilleta as Andrea Cantú Robles
 Rodrigo Brand as Omar Haddad Karam
 Ramsés Alemán as Juan Gabriel "Juanga" Ramírez Pérez
 Daniela Martínez Caballero as Regina Cantú Robles
 Andrés Vázquez as José José "Pepe Pepe" Ramírez Pérez
 André Sebastián González as Benjamín Ramírez Nieto
 Carmen Salinas as Margarita "Magos" Domínguez Negrete 
 María Rojo as Margarita "Magos" Domínguez Negrete

Recurring and guest stars 
 Adriana Fonseca as Lucía Nieto Paz
 Archie Lafranco as Pedro
 María Prado as Juanita
 Roberto Tello as Benito
 José Luis Duval as Mr. Ortiz
 Lorena San Martín as Patricia de la Garza
 Hans Gaitán as Mauricio
 Valeria Santaella as Kimberly
 Yekaterina Kiev as Helena
 Mónica Pont as Dr. María Campuzano
 Diana Golden as Macorina
 Alfredo Alfonso as Fabián
 Luis Arturo as Lorenzo
 Marco Muñoz as Julián Reus
 Marco Uriel as Chef Téllez
 René Casados as Heliodoro Flores
 Bea Ranero as Sandra Arellano
 Juan Vidal as Marco Saldívar
 Carlos Miguel as Luis Galindo

Production 
On 23 June 2021, the telenovela was announced by executive producer Nicandro Díaz González, under the title El amor cambia de piel. On 6 July 2021 Susana González and David Zepeda were cast in the lead roles. Filming of the telenovela began on 26 August 2021, now titled Mi fortuna es amarte. Filming concluded in February 2022.

Episodes

Reception

Ratings 
 
}}

Awards and nominations

Notes

References

External links 
 

2021 telenovelas
2021 Mexican television series debuts
2022 Mexican television series endings
2020s Mexican television series
Televisa telenovelas
Mexican telenovelas
Mexican television series based on Colombian television series
Spanish-language telenovelas